Page is a city in Coconino County, Arizona, United States, near the Glen Canyon Dam and Lake Powell. As of the 2010 census, the population of the city was 7,247.

History
Unlike other cities in the area, Page was founded in 1957 as a housing community for workers and their families during the construction of nearby Glen Canyon Dam on the Colorado River. Its  site was obtained in a land exchange with the Navajo Nation.

The city was originally called Government Camp, but was later named for John C. Page, commissioner of the Bureau of Reclamation, 1936–1943.

After the dam was completed in 1966, Page officially incorporated as a town on March 1, 1975. The city grew steadily to today's population  over 7,000. Because of the new roads and bridge built for use during construction, it has become the gateway to the Glen Canyon National Recreation Area and Lake Powell, attracting more than 3 million visitors per year. Page is also the home of two of the largest electrical generation units in the western United States. Glen Canyon Dam has a 1,288,000-kilowatt capacity when fully online. The other power plant to the southeast is the Navajo Generating Station, which ceased operations in 2019.  It was a coal-fired steam plant with an output capability of 2,250,000 kilowatts. On December 18, 2020, the three smokestacks of the Navajo Generating Station were demolished.

In 1997, Antelope Canyon was opened to tourism on Navajo land adjacent to Page.  This natural slot canyon, formed by erosion, has created a steady increase in tourism for Page, as word spread of the beauty of the canyon.  Several tour companies, all Navajo owned, now offer guided excursions into Antelope Canyon.  Visitors are not allowed to explore on their own, and must be accompanied by a Navajo guide from one of the local tour companies.  Another natural treasure that has recently increased in popularity is Horseshoe Bend Overlook.  This dramatic view from above allows visitors to see the U-shaped turn in the Colorado River.  Half of Horseshoe Bend Overlook is owned by the City of Page. The other half is on Navajo land and is privately owned.  On the side owned by the city, visitors can pay a small parking fee, and walk about 20 minutes to the overlook.

Due to the popularity of social media, and the awareness of Antelope Canyon and Horseshoe Bend, the city of Page has grown significantly in recent years.  Many new hotels and other services have opened to support the increase in tourism to the area.  Although Lake Powell and Glen Canyon Dam have had a longer time to draw tourists, they now combine with these more recently known attractions to offer a multifaceted tourism destination.

Geography
Page is located at  (36.914296, -111.459717). The city's elevation is 4,117 ft (1,255 m).

Climate
Page has an arid climate (Köppen BWk) with hot, very dry summers and chilly winters with very little snow. It is located in the southern edge of the Great Basin Desert on the Colorado Plateau. It is very dry due to being in the rainshadow of the mountains of California and too far north to get consistent North American monsoons.

<div style="width:100%;">

Demographics

As of the census of 2010,  7,247 people, 2,518 households, and 1,822 families resided in the city. The 2,787 housing units averaged . The racial makeup of the city was 57.6% White, 0.3% African American, 34.0%  Native American, 0.9% Asian, 2.1% from other races, and 5.0% from two or more races. About 7.3% of the population was Hispanic or Latino of any race.

Of the 2,518 households, 40.6% had children under the age of 18 living with them, 51.9% were married couples living together, 12.9% had a female householder with no husband present, and 27.6% were not families. Around 20.7% of all households were made up of individuals, and 7.7% had someone living alone who was 65 years of age or older. The average household size was 2.87, and the average family size was 3.32.

In the city, the population was distributed as 29.6% under the age of 18, 10.4% from 18 to 24, 26.2% from 25 to 44, 26.0% from 45 to 64, and 9% who were 65 years of age or older. The median age was 32.5 years. For every 100 females, there were 101.5 males. For every 100 females age 18 and over, there were 100.9 males.

As of the 2015 American Community Survey, the median income for a household in the city was $57,161, and for a family was $64,135. Males had a median full-time income of $47,779 versus $37,656 for females. The per capita income for the city was $24,338. About 14.1% of families and 14.4% of the population were below the poverty line, including 18.7% of those under age 18 and 1.5% of those age 65 or over.

Education
Much of Page is served by the Page Unified School District. The public schools are Lake View Primary School; Desert View Intermediate School, Page Middle School, Page High School, Manson Mesa High School, and Tse Yaato High School. The Glen Canyon Outdoor Academy is the only charter school.

Portions of Page are in the Fredonia-Moccasin Unified School District.

Economy

Top employers
According to Page's 2020 Comprehensive Annual Financial Report, the top employers in the city are:

Facilities

Transportation
Page is located on U.S. Route 89. Arizona State Route 98 heads east into the Navajo Reservation.

Public transportation is provided by Helping Hands Agency, a local nonprofit, under the name Express, with service extending to Tuba City, Cameron, Shonto, and Wahweap. 

National Park Express provides a daily shuttle between Page and Las Vegas and Page and Grand Canyon Village.

Page Municipal Airport serves Page with scheduled, charter, and general aviation.

Cemetery
The city's cemetery is on South Lake Powell Boulevard.

Media
 KNAD 91.7 NPR repeater station.
 KXAZ 93.3 Page
 KPLD 105.1 Kanab
 KPGE 1340 AM

The Lake Powell Chronicle is the weekly newspaper in Page.

Notable person
 Mary Antonia Wood, artist

References

External links

 City of Page official website
 Page Arizona Chamber of Commerce

 
Cities in Coconino County, Arizona
Cities in Arizona
Populated places established in 1957
Cemeteries in Arizona